Events from the year 1656 in Sweden

Incumbents
 Monarch – Charles X Gustav

Events
 

 
 
 January 17 – Treaty of Königsberg is signed, establishing an alliance between Charles X Gustav of Sweden and Frederick William, Elector of Brandenburg.
 Battle of Radom (1656)
 Battle of Gołąb
 April 1 – Lwów Oath: John II Casimir Vasa, King of Poland, crowns the Black Madonna of Częstochowa as Queen and Protector of Poland in the cathedral of Lwów after the miraculous saving of the Jasna Góra Monastery during the Deluge, an event which changed the course of the Second Northern War.
 Battle of Warka
 Russo-Swedish War (1656–58)
 July 28–30 – Battle of Warsaw: Led by King Charles X Gustav of Sweden, the armies of the Swedish Empire and the Margraviate of Brandenburg defeat the forces of the Polish–Lithuanian Commonwealth near Warsaw.
 Battle of Filipów
 December 20 – Treaty of Labiau is signed between Charles X Gustav of Sweden and Frederick William, Elector of Brandenburg.
 Battle of Chojnice (1656)
 The Stockholms Banco, the first bank to issue banknotes, is founded.
 The case of Karin Svensdotter, who claimed to have sexual relations with a fairy.

Births

 May 26 - Märta Ljungberg, innkeeper and local profile (died 1741) 
 
 
 

 date unknown - Gertrud Svensdotter, the first witness accuser in the Great Witch Hunt of 1668 (died 1675)

Deaths

References

 
Years of the 17th century in Sweden
Sweden